La Trinité may refer to:

Places in France
La Trinité, Alpes-Maritimes (AKA La Trinité-Victor), in the Alpes-Maritimes département 
La Trinité, Eure, in the Eure département
La Trinité, Manche, in the Manche département 
La Trinité, Martinique, in the Martinique overseas department
La Trinité, Savoie, in the Savoie département
 La Trinité-de-Réville, in the Eure département 
 La Trinité-des-Laitiers, in the Orne département
 La Trinité-de-Thouberville, in the Eure département 
 La Trinité-du-Mont, in the Seine-Maritime département
 La Trinité-Porhoët, in the Morbihan département 
 La Trinité-sur-Mer, in the Morbihan département 
 La Trinité-Surzur, in the Morbihan département

Other
Église de la Sainte-Trinité, Paris, a Roman Catholic church in Paris

See also
 Holy Trinity (disambiguation), the English version of the French expression